Daranak Falls is a waterfall located in the municipality of Tanay, and it's one of the most popular tourist attractions in the province of Rizal, Phiilippines.

Etymology 
Daranak Falls came from the Tagalog word "Dadanak"which means "to flow", shortened form of "Dumaranak". The latter word was used to describe the flowing water of the falls. Another origin says that it may also came from the word phrase "Dadanak ang dugo" its directly translated "the spilling of blood".

See also 

 Tanay, Rizal
 Hinulugang Taktak

References

External links 

Waterfalls of the Philippines
Tourist attractions in Rizal